The 1940 Duke Blue Devils football team was an American football team that represented Duke University as a member of the Southern Conference during the 1940 college football season. In its tenth season under head coach Wallace Wade, the team compiled a 7–2 record (4–1 against conference opponents), finished second in the conference, was ranked No. 18 in the final AP Poll, and outscored opponents by a total of 203 to 52.  Alex Winterson was the team captain. The team played its home games at Duke Stadium in Durham, North Carolina.

Schedule

References

Duke
Duke Blue Devils football seasons
Duke Blue Devils football